Dita Von Teese is the debut studio album by American entertainer Dita Von Teese. It was released on February 16, 2018, by Record Makers. The album charted in Belgium and France. A companion remix album, titled Dita Von Teese Remix, was released digitally on August 31, 2018.

Track listing

Personnel
Credits adapted from the liner notes of Dita Von Teese.

Musicians

 Dita Von Teese – vocals
 John Kirby – keyboards
 Daniel Stricker – beats, drums
 Smokey Hormel – guitar 
 Sébastien Tellier – guitar 
 Chris Taylor – woodwind 
 Molly Lewis – whistling 
 Nedelle Torrisi – backing vocals
 Amber Quintero – backing vocals
 Skylar Kaplan – backing vocals
 Piper Kaplan – backing vocals

Technical

 Mind Gamers – production 
 Pierre Rousseau – production 
 Nicolas Godin – additional production 
 Eric Gorman – engineering
 David Mestre – additional vocal production
 Timothy Dunn – live drums engineering, bass engineering
 Julien Delfaud – mixing
 Guillaume Jay – mixing assistance
 Alex Gopher – mastering

Artwork
 Camille Vivier – photography
 Laurent Fétis – artwork

Charts

References

2018 debut albums
Albums recorded at Kingsize Soundlabs